Acústica may refer to:

Antologia Acústica, acoustic compilation album by Brazilian solo artist Zé Ramalho
Tracción Acústica, the tenth album of Enanitos Verdes published in 1998
Versão Acústica, Brazilian acoustic rock band formed by Emmerson Nogueira
Versão Acústica (album), the first album by Brazilian acoustic rock musician Emmerson Nogueira
Versão Acústica 2, the second album by Brazilian Acoustic rock musician Emmerson Nogueira
Versão Acústica 3, the third album by Brazilian Acoustic rock musician Emmerson Nogueira

See also

 Acústico (disambiguation)
 Acoustica (disambiguation)
 Acoustic (disambiguation)